A quadratic residue code is a type of cyclic code.

Examples
Examples of quadratic
residue codes include the  Hamming code

Constructions
There is a quadratic residue code of length 
over the finite field  whenever 
 is a quadratic residue modulo .
Its generator polynomial as a cyclic code is given by

where  is the set of quadratic residues of
 in the set  and
 is a primitive th root of
The condition that  is a quadratic residue
of  ensures that the coefficients of 
The dimension of the code is
.
Replacing  by another primitive -th
root of unity  either results in the same code
or an equivalent code, according to whether or not 

An alternative construction avoids roots of unity. Define

for a suitable . When 
choose  to ensure that .
If  is odd, choose  ,
where  or  according to whether
modulo . Then  also generates
a quadratic residue code; more precisely the ideal of
 generated by 
corresponds to the quadratic residue code.

Weight
The minimum weight of a quadratic residue code of length 

Extended code
Adding an overall parity-check digit to a quadratic residue code
gives an extended quadratic residue code. When
 (mod ) an extended quadratic
residue code is self-dual; otherwise it is equivalent but not
equal to its dual. By the Gleason–Prange theorem (named for Andrew Gleason and Eugene Prange), the automorphism group of an extended quadratic residue
code has a subgroup which is isomorphic to

Decoding Method 
Since late 1980, there are many algebraic decoding algorithms were developed for correcting errors on quadratic residue codes.  These algorithms can achieve the (true) error-correcting capacity  of the quadratic residue codes with the code length up to 113. However, decoding of long binary quadratic residue codes and non-binary quadratic residue codes continue to be a challenge. Currently, decoding quadratic residue codes is still an active research area in the theory of error-correcting code.

References 
F. J. MacWilliams and N. J. A. Sloane, The Theory of Error-Correcting Codes, North-Holland Publishing Co., Amsterdam-New York-Oxford, 1977.
.
M. Elia, Algebraic decoding of the (23,12,7) Golay code, IEEE Transactions on Information Theory, Volume: 33 , Issue: 1 , pg. 150-151, January 1987.
Reed, I.S., Yin, X., Truong, T.K., Algebraic decoding of the (32, 16, 8) quadratic residue code. IEEE Trans. Inf. Theory 36(4), 876–880 (1990)
Reed, I.S., Truong, T.K., Chen, X., Yin, X., The algebraic decoding of the (41, 21, 9) quadratic residue code. IEEE Trans. Inf. Theory 38(3), 974–986 (1992)
Humphreys, J.F. Algebraic decoding of the ternary (13, 7, 5) quadratic-residue code. IEEE Trans. Inf. Theory 38(3), 1122–1125 (May 1992)
Chen, X., Reed, I.S., Truong, T.K., Decoding the (73, 37, 13) quadratic-residue code. IEE Proc., Comput. Digit. Tech. 141(5), 253–258 (1994)
Higgs, R.J., Humphreys, J.F.: Decoding the ternary (23, 12, 8) quadratic-residue code. IEE Proc., Comm. 142(3), 129–134 (June 1995)
He, R., Reed, I.S., Truong, T.K., Chen, X., Decoding the (47, 24, 11) quadratic residue code. IEEE Trans. Inf. Theory 47(3), 1181–1186 (2001)
….
Y. Li, Y. Duan, H. C. Chang, H. Liu, T. K. Truong, Using the difference of syndromes to decode quadratic residue codes, IEEE Trans. Inf. Theory 64(7), 5179-5190 (2018)

Quadratic residue
Coding theory